Kennedy is a village in the Canadian province of Saskatchewan within the Rural Municipality of Wawken No. 93 and Census Division No. 1. The village lies just south of Provincial Highway 48 about 3 km west of Highway 9.

Kennedy is home to the Moose Mountain Pro Rodeo which takes place every year on the third weekend in July. There is a post office (Canada Post), bank (Credit Union), bar/restaurant (Kennedy Hotel), store (Mann's Foods) with gas station, SGI, a K-8 school, and a few other amenities. There are two parks; one is located on schoolgrounds and one by the campgrounds.

History 
Kennedy incorporated as a village on November 5, 1907.

Demographics 

See also 

 List of communities in Saskatchewan
 Villages of Saskatchewan

References

Villages in Saskatchewan
Wawken No. 93, Saskatchewan
Division No. 1, Saskatchewan